The eleventh season of the police procedural drama NCIS premiered on September 24, 2013, in the same time slot as the previous seasons, Tuesdays at 8 pm. Special Agent Ziva David (Cote de Pablo), departs during the season with her final appearance being in "Past, Present and Future".  The episode "Crescent City (Part I)", which aired on March 25, 2014, serves as the first of a two-part backdoor pilot of a second spin off from NCIS called NCIS: New Orleans based in New Orleans.

Cast

Main 
 Mark Harmon as Leroy Jethro Gibbs, NCIS Supervisory Special Agent (SSA) of the Major Case Response Team (MCRT) assigned to Washington's Navy Yard
 Michael Weatherly as Anthony DiNozzo, NCIS Senior Special Agent, second in command of MCRT
 Cote de Pablo as Ziva David, NCIS Special Agent (episodes 1–2)
 Pauley Perrette as Abby Sciuto, Forensic Specialist for NCIS
 Sean Murray as Timothy McGee, NCIS Special Agent
 Brian Dietzen as Jimmy Palmer, Assistant Medical Examiner for NCIS
 Emily Wickersham as Eleanor "Ellie" Bishop, NCIS Probationary Special Agent and Former NSA Analyst, loaned to NCIS on Joint Duty Assignment (episodes 9–24)
 Rocky Carroll as Leon Vance, NCIS Director
 David McCallum as Dr. Donald "Ducky" Mallard, Chief Medical Examiner for NCIS

Recurring 
 Alan Dale as Thomas Morrow, Homeland Security Section Chief and former NCIS Director
 Joe Spano as Tobias Fornell, FBI Senior Special Agent
 Colin Hanks as Richard Parsons, DoD Inspector
 Marina Sirtis as Orli Elbaz, Mossad Director
 Damon Dayoub as Adam Eshel, Ziva's contact
 Gabi Coccio as young Ziva David
 Hugo Armstrong as Eugene Coyle, from the NCIS Inspector General's office
 Salli Richardson-Whitfield as Carrie Clark, former FBI Special Agent, turned criminal attorney
 Meredith Eaton as Carol Wilson, immunologist and friend of Abby
 Susanna Thompson as Hollis Mann, DoD Special Agent, Gibbs' former girlfriend and former Army CID agent
 Wendy Makkena as Dr. Rachel Cranston, a psychiatrist and Caitlin Todd's sister
 Ralph Waite as Jackson Gibbs, Gibbs' father
 Robert Wagner as Anthony DiNozzo, Sr., Tony's father
 Michelle Pierce as Breena Palmer, Jimmy Palmer's wife
 Jackie Geary as Susan Grady, NCIS Polygraph Specialist
 Diane Neal as Abigail Borin, CGIS Special Agent in Charge
 Marco Sanchez as Alejandro Rivera, incarcerated former official in the Mexican Justice Department and enemy of Gibbs
 Akinsola Aribo as Jared Vance, Leon Vance's son
 Kiara Muhammad as Kayla Vance, Leon Vance's daughter
 Melinda McGraw as Diane Sterling, Gibbs' and Fornell's ex-wife
 Leslie Hope as Sarah Porter, new Secretary of the Navy
 Margo Harshman as Delilah Fielding, DoD Computer Specialist and McGee's girlfriend
 Juliette Angelo as Emily Fornell, Tobias Fornell's daughter
 Kelli Williams as Maureen Cabot, NCIS Special Agent

Guest appearances 
 Muse Watson as Mike Franks, deceased retired Senior Special Agent for NCIS and Gibbs' former boss
 Scott Bakula as Dwayne Cassius Pride, NCIS Senior Special Agent in New Orleans
 Lucas Black as Christopher Lasalle, NCIS Special Agent in New Orleans, second in command
 Zoe McLellan as Meredith Brody, NCIS Special Agent in Chicago
 C. C. H. Pounder as Loretta Wade, Jefferson Parish Medical Examiner for NCIS in New Orleans

Production 
On February 1, 2013, CBS renewed NCIS for this season. The same date Mark Harmon extended his contract on the show with a new "multiyear deal" with CBS. It was announced on July 10, 2013 that Cote de Pablo, who plays Ziva David, had chosen not to return for the eleventh season as a regular. She will appear in enough episodes to close out her character's storylines.
Because of de Pablo's exit, showrunner Gary Glasberg had to change his planned storyline for season 11. "Someone asked me if I was planning for this, but I really wasn't, so basically the minute that this became real, I had to throw out a lot of what I was planning to do and start from scratch". Glasberg has stated that there will be rotating characters coming to fill Ziva's role.

The theme for the season is "unlocking demons", both figurative and literal according to Glasberg. A "pretty interesting adversary" about the theme will be introduced, and "that will carry through the season".

Casting 
Colin Hanks returned for the premiere episode as Defense Department investigator Richard Parsons, a character introduced at the end of the tenth season, while Marina Sirtis returned in the second episode as Mossad Director Orli Elbaz. Joe Spano also reprised his role as Senior FBI Agent Tobias C. Fornell in the first two episodes. Muse Watson (as Mike Franks) appeared in the fourth episode. Ralph Waite (as Gibbs' father Jackson Gibbs) and Robert Wagner (as Tony's father Anthony DiNozzo, Sr.) are also confirmed to return. Diane Neal reprises her role CGIS Special Agent Abigail Borin in episode six "Oil & Water".

The second episode includes a character named Sarah Porter, played by Leslie Hope, who is the new Secretary of the Navy, while Margo Harshman has been cast in a potentially recurring role as Timothy McGee's girlfriend, Delilah Fielding. The third episode introduces retiring NCIS Special Agent Vera Strickland (Roma Maffia) who has known Gibbs for many years.

On August 13, 2013, "casting intel" on a new female character named Bishop was published, with filming scheduled to mid-October. Bishop is described as a "twentysomething female[;] bright, educated, athletic, attractive, fresh-faced, focused and somewhat socially awkward. She has a mysterious mixture of analytic brilliance, fierce determination and idealism. She's traveled extensively, but only feels comfortable at home." Emily Wickersham was cast to play the character, named NSA Analyst Ellie Bishop.  Wickersham was promoted to the main cast, two weeks prior of her debut appearance. Her first appearance is in episode nine, "Gut Check".

Scott Bakula was considered for an undisclosed recurring role this season.  He was later cast as Dwayne Pride in NCIS: New Orleans.

Episodes

Ratings

References 

Works cited

General references

External links 

 

2013 American television seasons
2014 American television seasons
NCIS 11